Afortunado is an album by Joan Sebastian, released in December 2002 through the record label Musart. In 2004, the album earned Sebastian a Grammy Award for Best Mexican/Mexican-American Album.

Track listing
All songs written by Sebastian.

 "Don Marcos" – 2:53
 "Adios Cariño" – 4:05
 "Del 8 de Abril" – 2:32
 "El Polvo de Tus Pasos" – 2:55
 "El General" – 2:38
 "Y No Hagas Caso" – 3:03
 "Seria Una Lastima" – 3:18
 "Sentimental" – 2:49
 "Asi Te Quiero" – 3:20
 "Hoy Por Hoy" – 2:48
 "Desamor" – 3:10
 "Afortunado" – 3:15

References

External links
 Joan Sebastian's official site

2002 albums
Joan Sebastian albums
Albums produced by Joan Sebastian
Grammy Award for Best Mexican/Mexican-American Album